George Călințaru (born 26 February 1989) is a Romanian professional footballer who plays as a midfielder for Liga II side Concordia Chiajna.

Honours
CSA Steaua București
Liga III: 2020–21

References

External links

 
 

1989 births
Living people
Footballers from Bucharest
Romanian footballers
Liga I players
Liga II players
ASC Daco-Getica București players
CS Brănești players
FC Viitorul Constanța players
FCV Farul Constanța players
FC Voluntari players
AFC Turris-Oltul Turnu Măgurele players
CSA Steaua București footballers
CS Concordia Chiajna players
Association football midfielders